1963–64 was the 17th season of the Western International Hockey League. 

The WIHL did not operate during the 1962-63 season.

Standings

 Spokane Jets								48		30	17	 1 244	171	 61
 Kimberley Dynamiters						        48        	30	18	 0 272	243	 60
 Nelson Maple Leafs 							48		24	24 	 0 233	229	 48
 Rossland Warriors							48		18	27	 3 200	251	 39
 Trail Smoke Eaters							48		15	31	 2 203	274	 32

Playoffs

Semi finals
 Spokane Jets defeated Rossland Warriors 3 games to 2 (3-4, 4-5, 5-4, 8-3, 2-1)
 Kimberley Dynamiters defeated Nelson Maple Leafs 3 games to 0 (5-0, 6-5, 6-2)

Final
 Kimberley Dynamiters defeated Spokane Jets 4 games to 3 (7-4, 4-2, 3-5, 3-4, 4-3, 0-3, 6-3)

Since this was the only senior league in the province, the Kimberley Dynamiters advanced to the 1963-64 Western Canada Allan Cup Playoffs.

References 

The Spokesman-Review - 21 Oct 1963
Spokane Daily Chronicle - 22 Oct 1963
The Spokesman-Review - 23 Oct 1963
The Spokesman-Review - 24 Oct 1963
Spokane Daily Chronicle - 2 Dec 1963
Spokane Daily Chronicle - 5 Dec 1963
The Spokesman-Review - 6 Dec 1963
The Spokesman-Review - 9 Dec 1963
Spokane Daily Chronicle - 9 Dec 1963
Spokane Daily Chronicle - 11 Dec 1963
The Spokesman-Review - 17 Dec 1963
The Spokesman-Review - Dec 17, 1963
Spokane Daily Chronicle - Dec 18, 1963
The Spokesman-Review - Dec 21, 1963
Spokane Daily Chronicle - Dec 23, 1963
The Spokesman-Review - Dec 25, 1963
The Spokesman-Review - Dec 26, 1963
The Spokesman-Review - Dec 27, 1963
The Spokesman-Review - Dec 27, 1963
Spokane Daily Chronicle - Dec 27, 1963
The Spokesman-Review - Dec 28, 1963
Spokane Daily Chronicle - Dec 28, 1963
Spokane Daily Chronicle - 6 Jan 1964
Spokane Daily Chronicle - 8 Jan 1964
The Spokesman-Review - 13 Feb 1964
Spokane Daily Chronicle - 14 Feb 1964
Spokane Daily Chronicle - 17 Feb 1964
The Spokesman-Review - 17 Feb 1964
Spokane Daily Chronicle - 21 Feb 1964
Spokane Daily Chronicle - 24 Feb 1964
The Spokesman-Review - 26 Feb 1964
The Spokesman-Review - Feb 27, 1964
Spokane Daily Chronicle - 2 Mar 1964
Spokane Daily Chronicle - 9 Mar 1964
Spokane Daily Chronicle - 11 Mar 1964

Western International Hockey League seasons
Wihl
Wihl